The following ships are among the more notable vessels involved in the evacuation of allied troops from Dunkirk, France during Operation Dynamo between 26 May and 4 June 1940.

MS Batory
SS Ben-my-Chree (1927)
SS Fenella (1936)
TS King George V
SS King Orry (1913)
RMS Lady of Mann
SS Levenwood (1924)
TSS Manxman (1904)
SS Mona's Isle (1905)
SS Mona's Queen (1934)
TSS Scotia (1920)
SS Tynwald (1936)

SS Canterbury
SS Maid of Orleans
SS Prague
SS Malines
HMHS Paris - hospital ship

Minesweepers of 1st, 4th, 5th, 6th,  7th, 10th, and 12th Mine Sweeping Flotillas
HMS Albury
HMS Brighton Belle
HMS Brighton Queen
HMS Devonia
HMS Duchess Of Fife
HMS Dundalk
HMS Emperor Of India
HMS Fitzroy
HMS Glen Avon
HMS Glen Gower 
HMS Gossamer
HMS Gracie Fields
HMS Halcyon
HMS Hebe
HMS Kellet
HMS Leda
HMS Lydd 
HMS Marmion
HMS Medway Queen
HMS Niger
HMS Oriole
HMS Pangbourne
HMS Plinlimmon
HMS Princess Elizabeth
HMS Queen Of Thanet
HMS Ross
HMS Salamander
HMS Saltash
HMS Sandown
HMS Sharpshooter
HMS Skipjack  
HMS Snaefell
HMS Speedwell
HMS Sutton 
HMS Waverley
HMS Westward Ho
HMS Whippingham

See also
Little ships of Dunkirk

Notes and references

Little Ships of Dunkirk

Battle of France
Dunkirk